Rob Meppelink (born 18 January 1966 in Wateringen) is a former amateur football player from Netherlands. He became a football coach in 1990. Since then he guided clubs like AZ Alkmaar, ADO Den Haag, and RBC Roosendaal.

References
Profile

1966 births
Living people
ADO Den Haag managers
Dutch football managers
Dutch footballers
People from Wateringen
RBC Roosendaal managers
Association footballers not categorized by position
K.R.C. Genk non-playing staff
Footballers from South Holland